Broken Hearts of Broadway is a 1923 silent film drama produced and directed by Irving Cummings and starring Colleen Moore, Johnnie Walker and Alice Lake. It is based on a 1917 play Broken Hearts of Broadway by James Kyrle McCurdy.

Cast
Colleen Moore as Mary Ellis
Johnnie Walker as George Colton
Alice Lake as Bubbles Revere
Tully Marshall as Barney Ryan
Kate Price as Lydia Ryan
Creighton Hale as  An Outcast
Tony Merlo as Tony Guido (*as Anthony Merlo)
Arthur Stuart Hull as Barry Peale
Freeman Wood as Frank Huntleigh

Preservation
Copies are preserved in the Library of Congress, the Academy Film Archive collection and Blackhawk Films.

References

External links
Broken Hearts of Broadway @ IMDb.com

the film on dvd

1923 films
American silent feature films
Films directed by Irving Cummings
American black-and-white films
1923 drama films
Silent American drama films
Selznick Pictures films
1920s American films